Blue Sky Records was a custom record label created by Steve Paul for Columbia Records, featuring acts managed by Steve Paul, primarily blues-oriented performers Johnny Winter, Edgar Winter, Rick Derringer, Dan Hartman, David Johansen, and Muddy Waters.

History
Blue Sky Records was started by Steve Paul in 1973. The executive vice president of the specialty label, promoted and distributed by Columbia Records, was Rick Dobbis. Dobbis later became the president of Sony Music International and senior vice-president at Arista Records. Through the production activities of Johnny Winter, the label was instrumental in reviving the career of Muddy Waters. In 1983, when Winter departed from the label, the label largely ceased operations & was folded into Columbia.

Principal Blue Sky Records Releases
1973 Rick Derringer, All American Boy
1975 Rick Derringer, Spring Fever
1975 Edgar Winter, The Edgar Winter Group With Rick Derringer
1975 Edgar Winter, Jasmine Nightdreams
1976 Johnny Winter, Captured Live!
1976 Dan Hartman, Who Is Dan Hartman? (Promo release)
1976 Johnny Winter and Edgar Winter, Together: Edgar Winter and Johnny Winter Live
1976 Dan Hartman, Images
1977 Muddy Waters, Hard Again
1977 Edgar Winter, Edgar Winter's White Trash - Recycled
1977 Johnny Winter, Nothin' But the Blues
1978 Muddy Waters, I'm Ready
1978 Johnny Winter, White, Hot and Blue
1978 Dan Hartman, Instant Replay
1978 David Johansen, David Johansen
1979 Muddy Waters, Muddy "Mississippi" Waters - Live
1979 Dan Hartman, Relight My Fire
1979 David Johansen, In Style
1979 Edgar Winter, The Edgar Winter Album
1980 Johnny Winter, Raisin' Cain
1981 Muddy Waters, King Bee
1981 Dan Hartman, It Hurts to Be In Love
1981 David Johansen, Here Comes The Night
1982 David Johansen, Live It Up

References

American record labels
Columbia Records